An aircraft is a vehicle that is able to fly by gaining support from the air. It counters the force of gravity by using either static lift or the dynamic lift of an airfoil, or, in a few cases, the downward thrust from jet engines. Common examples of aircraft include airplanes, helicopters, airships (including blimps), gliders, paramotors, and hot air balloons.

The human activity that surrounds aircraft is called aviation. The science of aviation, including designing and building aircraft, is called aeronautics. Crewed aircraft are flown by an onboard pilot, whereas unmanned aerial vehicles may be remotely controlled or self-controlled by onboard computers. Aircraft may be classified by different criteria, such as lift type, aircraft propulsion, usage and others.

History 

Flying model craft and stories of manned flight go back many centuries; however, the first manned ascent — and safe descent — in modern times took place by larger hot-air balloons developed in the 18th century. Each of the two World Wars led to great technical advances. Consequently, the history of aircraft can be divided into five eras:
 Pioneers of flight, from the earliest experiments to 1914.
 First World War, 1914 to 1918.
 Aviation between the World Wars, 1918 to 1939.
 Second World War, 1939 to 1945.
 Postwar era, also called the Jet Age, 1945 to the present day.

Methods of lift

Lighter than air – aerostats 

Aerostats use buoyancy to float in the air in much the same way that ships float on the water. They are characterized by one or more large cells or canopies, filled with a relatively low-density gas such as helium, hydrogen, or hot air, which is less dense than the surrounding air. When the weight of this is added to the weight of the aircraft structure, it adds up to the same weight as the air that the craft displaces.

Small hot-air balloons, called sky lanterns, were first invented in ancient China prior to the 3rd century BC and used primarily in cultural celebrations, and were only the second type of aircraft to fly, the first being kites, which were first invented in ancient China over two thousand years ago. (See Han Dynasty)

A balloon was originally any aerostat, while the term airship was used for large, powered aircraft designs — usually fixed-wing. In 1919, Frederick Handley Page was reported as referring to "ships of the air," with smaller passenger types as "Air yachts." In the 1930s, large intercontinental flying boats were also sometimes referred to as "ships of the air" or "flying-ships". — though none had yet been built. The advent of powered balloons, called dirigible balloons, and later of rigid hulls allowing a great increase in size, began to change the way these words were used. Huge powered aerostats, characterized by a rigid outer framework and separate aerodynamic skin surrounding the gas bags, were produced, the Zeppelins being the largest and most famous. There were still no fixed-wing aircraft or non-rigid balloons large enough to be called airships, so "airship" came to be synonymous with these aircraft. Then several accidents, such as the Hindenburg disaster in 1937, led to the demise of these airships. Nowadays a "balloon" is an unpowered aerostat and an "airship" is a powered one.

A powered, steerable aerostat is called a dirigible. Sometimes this term is applied only to non-rigid balloons, and sometimes dirigible balloon is regarded as the definition of an airship (which may then be rigid or non-rigid). Non-rigid dirigibles are characterized by a moderately aerodynamic gasbag with stabilizing fins at the back. These soon became known as blimps. During World War II, this shape was widely adopted for tethered balloons; in windy weather, this both reduces the strain on the tether and stabilizes the balloon. The nickname blimp was adopted along with the shape. In modern times, any small dirigible or airship is called a blimp, though a blimp may be unpowered as well as powered.

Heavier-than-air – aerodynes 

Heavier-than-air aircraft, such as airplanes, must find some way to push air or gas downwards so that a reaction occurs (by Newton's laws of motion) to push the aircraft upwards. This dynamic movement through the air is the origin of the term. There are two ways to produce dynamic upthrust — aerodynamic lift, and powered lift in the form of engine thrust.

Aerodynamic lift involving wings is the most common, with fixed-wing aircraft being kept in the air by the forward movement of wings, and rotorcraft by spinning wing-shaped rotors sometimes called "rotary wings." A wing is a flat, horizontal surface, usually shaped in cross-section as an aerofoil. To fly, air must flow over the wing and generate lift. A flexible wing is a wing made of fabric or thin sheet material, often stretched over a rigid frame. A kite is tethered to the ground and relies on the speed of the wind over its wings, which may be flexible or rigid, fixed, or rotary.

With powered lift, the aircraft directs its engine thrust vertically downward. V/STOL aircraft, such as the Harrier jump jet and Lockheed Martin F-35B take off and land vertically using powered lift and transfer to aerodynamic lift in steady flight.

A pure rocket is not usually regarded as an aerodyne because it does not depend on the air for its lift (and can even fly into space); however, many aerodynamic lift vehicles have been powered or assisted by rocket motors. Rocket-powered missiles that obtain aerodynamic lift at very high speed due to airflow over their bodies are a marginal case.

Fixed-wing 

The forerunner of the fixed-wing aircraft is the kite. Whereas a fixed-wing aircraft relies on its forward speed to create airflow over the wings, a kite is tethered to the ground and relies on the wind blowing over its wings to provide lift. Kites were the first kind of aircraft to fly and were invented in China around 500 BC. Much aerodynamic research was done with kites before test aircraft, wind tunnels, and computer modelling programs became available.

The first heavier-than-air craft capable of controlled free-flight were gliders. A glider designed by George Cayley carried out the first true manned, controlled flight in 1853.

The practical, powered, fixed-wing aircraft (the airplane or aeroplane) was invented by Wilbur and Orville Wright. Besides the method of propulsion, fixed-wing aircraft are in general characterized by their wing configuration. The most important wing characteristics are:
 Number of wings — monoplane, biplane, etc.
 Wing support — Braced or cantilever, rigid, or flexible.
 Wing planform — including aspect ratio, angle of sweep, and any variations along the span (including the important class of delta wings).
 Location of the horizontal stabilizer, if any.
 Dihedral angle — positive, zero, or negative (anhedral).

A variable geometry aircraft can change its wing configuration during flight.

A flying wing has no fuselage, though it may have small blisters or pods. The opposite of this is a lifting body, which has no wings, though it may have small stabilizing and control surfaces.

Wing-in-ground-effect vehicles are generally not considered aircraft. They "fly" efficiently close to the surface of the ground or water, like conventional aircraft during takeoff. An example is the Russian ekranoplan nicknamed the "Caspian Sea Monster". Man-powered aircraft also rely on ground effect to remain airborne with minimal pilot power, but this is only because they are so underpowered—in fact, the airframe is capable of flying higher.

Rotorcraft 

Rotorcraft, or rotary-wing aircraft, use a spinning rotor with aerofoil cross-section blades (a rotary wing) to provide lift. Types include helicopters, autogyros, and various hybrids such as gyrodynes and compound rotorcraft.

Helicopters have a rotor turned by an engine-driven shaft. The rotor pushes air downward to create lift. By tilting the rotor forward, the downward flow is tilted backward, producing thrust for forward flight. Some helicopters have more than one rotor and a few have rotors turned by gas jets at the tips. Some have a tail rotor to counteract the rotation of the main rotor, and to aid directional control.

Autogyros have unpowered rotors, with a separate power plant to provide thrust. The rotor is tilted backward. As the autogyro moves forward, air blows upward across the rotor, making it spin. This spinning increases the speed of airflow over the rotor, to provide lift. Rotor kites are unpowered autogyros, which are towed to give them forward speed or tethered to a static anchor in high-wind for kited flight.

Cyclogyros rotate their wings about a horizontal axis.

Compound rotorcraft have wings that provide some or all of the lift in forward flight. They are nowadays classified as powered lift types and not as rotorcraft. Tiltrotor aircraft (such as the Bell Boeing V-22 Osprey), tiltwing, tail-sitter, and coleopter aircraft have their rotors/propellers horizontal for vertical flight and vertical for forward flight.

Other methods of lift 

 A lifting body is an aircraft body shaped to produce lift. If there are any wings, they are too small to provide significant lift and are used only for stability and control. Lifting bodies are not efficient: they suffer from high drag, and must also travel at high speed to generate enough lift to fly. Many of the research prototypes, such as the Martin Marietta X-24, which led up to the Space Shuttle, were lifting bodies, though the Space Shuttle is not, and some supersonic missiles obtain lift from the airflow over a tubular body.
 Powered lift types rely on engine-derived lift for vertical takeoff and landing (VTOL). Most types transition to fixed-wing lift for horizontal flight. Classes of powered lift types include VTOL jet aircraft (such as the Harrier jump jet) and tiltrotors, such as the Bell Boeing V-22 Osprey, among others. A few experimental designs rely entirely on engine thrust to provide lift throughout the whole flight, including personal fan-lift hover platforms and jetpacks. VTOL research designs include the Rolls-Royce Thrust Measuring Rig.
 The Flettner airplane uses a rotating cylinder in place of a fixed wing, obtaining lift from the Magnus effect.
 The ornithopter obtains thrust by flapping its wings.

Size and speed extremes

Size 

The smallest aircraft are toys/recreational items, and nano aircraft.

The largest aircraft by weight and largest regular fixed-wing aircraft ever built, was the Antonov An-225 Mriya. It holds the world payload record, after transporting  of goods, and has flown  loads commercially. The aircraft was destroyed during the Russo-Ukrainian War.

The 8-engine, piston/propeller Hughes H-4 Hercules "Spruce Goose" — an American World War II wooden flying boat transport with a greater wingspan (94m/260ft) than any current aircraft and a tail height equal to the tallest (Airbus A380-800 at 24.1m/78ft) — flew only one short hop in the late 1940s and never flew out of ground effect.

The largest civilian airplanes, apart from the above-noted An-225 and An-124, are the Airbus Beluga cargo transport derivative of the Airbus A300 jet airliner, the Boeing Dreamlifter cargo transport derivative of the Boeing 747 jet airliner/transport (the 747-200B was, at its creation in the 1960s, the heaviest aircraft ever built, with a maximum weight of over ), and the double-decker Airbus A380 "super-jumbo" jet airliner (the world's largest passenger airliner).

Speeds 

The fastest fixed-wing aircraft and fastest glider, is the Space Shuttle, which re-entered the atmosphere at nearly Mach 25 or 

Prior to the X-43A, the fastest recorded powered airplane flight, and still the record for the fastest manned powered airplane, was the North American X-15, rocket-powered airplane at Mach 6.7 or 7,274 km/h (4,520 mph) on 3 October 1967.

The fastest manned, air-breathing powered airplane is the Lockheed SR-71 Blackbird, a U.S. reconnaissance jet fixed-wing aircraft, having reached  on 28 July 1976.

Propulsion

Unpowered aircraft 

Gliders are heavier-than-air aircraft that do not employ propulsion once airborne. Take-off may be by launching forward and downward from a high location, or by pulling into the air on a tow-line, either by a ground-based winch or vehicle, or by a powered "tug" aircraft. For a glider to maintain its forward air speed and lift, it must descend in relation to the air (but not necessarily in relation to the ground). Many gliders can "soar", i.e., gain height from updrafts such as thermal currents. The first practical, controllable example was designed and built by the British scientist and pioneer George Cayley, whom many recognise as the first aeronautical engineer. Common examples of gliders are sailplanes, hang gliders and paragliders.

Balloons drift with the wind, though normally the pilot can control the altitude, either by heating the air or by releasing ballast, giving some directional control (since the wind direction changes with altitude). A wing-shaped hybrid balloon can glide directionally when rising or falling; but a spherically shaped balloon does not have such directional control.

Kites are aircraft that are tethered to the ground or other object (fixed or mobile) that maintains tension in the tether or kite line; they rely on virtual or real wind blowing over and under them to generate lift and drag. Kytoons are balloon-kite hybrids that are shaped and tethered to obtain kiting deflections, and can be lighter-than-air, neutrally buoyant, or heavier-than-air.

Powered aircraft 

Powered aircraft have one or more onboard sources of mechanical power, typically aircraft engines although rubber and manpower have also been used. Most aircraft engines are either lightweight reciprocating engines or gas turbines. Engine fuel is stored in tanks, usually in the wings but larger aircraft also have additional fuel tanks in the fuselage.

Propeller aircraft 

Propeller aircraft use one or more propellers (airscrews) to create thrust in a forward direction. The propeller is usually mounted in front of the power source in tractor configuration but can be mounted behind in pusher configuration. Variations of propeller layout include contra-rotating propellers and ducted fans.

Many kinds of power plant have been used to drive propellers. Early airships used man power or steam engines. The more practical internal combustion piston engine was used for virtually all fixed-wing aircraft until World War II and is still used in many smaller aircraft. Some types use turbine engines to drive a propeller in the form of a turboprop or propfan. Human-powered flight has been achieved, but has not become a practical means of transport. Unmanned aircraft and models have also used power sources such as electric motors and rubber bands.

Jet aircraft 

Jet aircraft use airbreathing jet engines, which take in air, burn fuel with it in a combustion chamber, and accelerate the exhaust rearwards to provide thrust.

Different jet engine configurations include the turbojet and turbofan, sometimes with the addition of an afterburner. Those with no rotating turbomachinery include the pulsejet and ramjet. These mechanically simple engines produce no thrust when stationary, so the aircraft must be launched to flying speed using a catapult, like the V-1 flying bomb, or a rocket, for example. Other engine types include the motorjet and the dual-cycle Pratt & Whitney J58.

They are also much more fuel-efficient than rockets. As a consequence nearly all large, high-speed or high-altitude aircraft use jet engines.

Rotorcraft 

Some rotorcraft, such as helicopters, have a powered rotary wing or rotor, where the rotor disc can be angled slightly forward so that a proportion of its lift is directed forwards. The rotor may, like a propeller, be powered by a variety of methods such as a piston engine or turbine. Experiments have also used jet nozzles at the rotor blade tips.

Other types of powered aircraft 
 Rocket-powered aircraft have occasionally been experimented with, and the Messerschmitt Me 163 Komet fighter even saw action in the Second World War. Since then, they have been restricted to research aircraft, such as the North American X-15, which traveled up into space where air-breathing engines cannot work (rockets carry their own oxidant). Rockets have more often been used as a supplement to the main power plant, typically for the rocket-assisted take off of heavily loaded aircraft, but also to provide high-speed dash capability in some hybrid designs such as the Saunders-Roe SR.53.
 The ornithopter obtains thrust by flapping its wings. It has found practical use in a model hawk used to freeze prey animals into stillness so that they can be captured, and in toy birds.

Design and construction 
Aircraft are designed according to many factors such as customer and manufacturer demand, safety protocols and physical and economic constraints. For many types of aircraft the design process is regulated by national airworthiness authorities.

The key parts of an aircraft are generally divided into three categories:
 The structure ("airframe") comprises the main load-bearing elements and associated equipment, as well as flight controls.
 The propulsion system ("powerplant") (if it is powered) comprises the power source and associated equipment, as described above.
 The avionics comprise the electrical and electronic control, navigation and communication systems.

Structure 
The approach to structural design varies widely between different types of aircraft. Some, such as paragliders, comprise only flexible materials that act in tension and rely on aerodynamic pressure to hold their shape. A balloon similarly relies on internal gas pressure, but may have a rigid basket or gondola slung below it to carry its payload. Early aircraft, including airships, often employed flexible doped aircraft fabric covering to give a reasonably smooth aeroshell stretched over a rigid frame. Later aircraft employed semi-monocoque techniques, where the skin of the aircraft is stiff enough to share much of the flight loads. In a true monocoque design there is no internal structure left. With the recent emphasis on sustainability hemp has picked up some attention, having a way smaller carbon foot print and 10 times stronger than steel, hemp could become the standard of manufacturing in the future. 

The key structural parts of an aircraft depend on what type it is.

Aerostats 

Lighter-than-air types are characterised by one or more gasbags, typically with a supporting structure of flexible cables or a rigid framework called its hull. Other elements such as engines or a gondola may also be attached to the supporting structure.

Aerodynes 

Heavier-than-air types are characterised by one or more wings and a central fuselage. The fuselage typically also carries a tail or empennage for stability and control, and an undercarriage for takeoff and landing. Engines may be located on the fuselage or wings. On a fixed-wing aircraft the wings are rigidly attached to the fuselage, while on a rotorcraft the wings are attached to a rotating vertical shaft. Smaller designs sometimes use flexible materials for part or all of the structure, held in place either by a rigid frame or by air pressure. The fixed parts of the structure comprise the airframe.

Power 

The source of motive power for an aircraft is normally called the powerplant, and includes engine or motor, propeller or rotor, (if any), jet nozzles and thrust reversers (if any), and accessories essential to the functioning of the engine or motor (e.g.: starter, ignition system, intake system, exhaust system, fuel system, lubrication system, engine cooling system, and engine controls).

Powered aircraft are typically powered by internal combustion engines (piston or turbine) burning fossil fuels -- typically gasoline (avgas) or jet fuel. A very few are powered by rocket power, ramjet propulsion, or by electric motors, or by internal combustion engines of other types, or using other fuels. A very few have been powered, for short flights, by human muscle energy (e.g.: Gossamer Condor).

Avionics 

The avionics comprise any electronic aircraft flight control systems and related equipment, including electronic cockpit instrumentation, navigation, radar, monitoring, and communications systems.

Flight characteristics

Flight envelope 

The flight envelope of an aircraft refers to its approved design capabilities in terms of airspeed, load factor and altitude. The term can also refer to other assessments of aircraft performance such as maneuverability. When an aircraft is abused, for instance by diving it at too-high a speed, it is said to be flown outside the envelope, something considered foolhardy since it has been taken beyond the design limits which have been established by the manufacturer. Going beyond the envelope may have a known outcome such as flutter or entry to a non-recoverable spin (possible reasons for the boundary).

Range 

The range is the distance an aircraft can fly between takeoff and landing, as limited by the time it can remain airborne.

For a powered aircraft the time limit is determined by the fuel load and rate of consumption.

For an unpowered aircraft, the maximum flight time is limited by factors such as weather conditions and pilot endurance. Many aircraft types are restricted to daylight hours, while balloons are limited by their supply of lifting gas. The range can be seen as the average ground speed multiplied by the maximum time in the air.

The Airbus A350-900ULR is now the longest range airliner.

Flight dynamics 

Flight dynamics is the science of air vehicle orientation and control in three dimensions. The three critical flight dynamics parameters are the angles of rotation around three axes which pass through the vehicle's center of gravity, known as pitch, roll, and yaw.
 Roll is a rotation about the longitudinal axis (equivalent to the rolling or heeling of a ship) giving an up-down movement of the wing tips measured by the roll or bank angle.
 Pitch is a rotation about the sideways horizontal axis giving an up-down movement of the aircraft nose measured by the angle of attack.
 Yaw is a rotation about the vertical axis giving a side-to-side movement of the nose known as sideslip.

Flight dynamics is concerned with the stability and control of an aircraft's rotation about each of these axes.

Stability 

An aircraft that is unstable tends to diverge from its intended flight path and so is difficult to fly. A very stable aircraft tends to stay on its flight path and is difficult to maneuver. Therefore, it is important for any design to achieve the desired degree of stability. Since the widespread use of digital computers, it is increasingly common for designs to be inherently unstable and rely on computerised control systems to provide artificial stability.

A fixed wing is typically unstable in pitch, roll, and yaw. Pitch and yaw stabilities of conventional fixed wing designs require horizontal and vertical stabilisers, which act similarly to the feathers on an arrow. These stabilizing surfaces allow equilibrium of aerodynamic forces and to stabilise the flight dynamics of pitch and yaw. They are usually mounted on the tail section (empennage), although in the canard layout, the main aft wing replaces the canard foreplane as pitch stabilizer. Tandem wing and tailless aircraft rely on the same general rule to achieve stability, the aft surface being the stabilising one.

A rotary wing is typically unstable in yaw, requiring a vertical stabiliser.

A balloon is typically very stable in pitch and roll due to the way the payload is slung underneath the center of lift.

Control 
Flight control surfaces enable the pilot to control an aircraft's flight attitude and are usually part of the wing or mounted on, or integral with, the associated stabilizing surface. Their development was a critical advance in the history of aircraft, which had until that point been uncontrollable in flight.

Aerospace engineers develop control systems for a vehicle's orientation (attitude) about its center of mass. The control systems include actuators, which exert forces in various directions, and generate rotational forces or moments about the aerodynamic center of the aircraft, and thus rotate the aircraft in pitch, roll, or yaw. For example, a pitching moment is a vertical force applied at a distance forward or aft from the aerodynamic center of the aircraft, causing the aircraft to pitch up or down. Control systems are also sometimes used to increase or decrease drag, for example to slow the aircraft to a safe speed for landing.

The two main aerodynamic forces acting on any aircraft are lift supporting it in the air and drag opposing its motion. Control surfaces or other techniques may also be used to affect these forces directly, without inducing any rotation.

Impacts of aircraft use 

Aircraft permit long distance, high speed travel and may be a more fuel efficient mode of transportation in some circumstances. Aircraft have environmental and climate impacts beyond fuel efficiency considerations, however. They are also relatively noisy compared to other forms of travel and high altitude aircraft generate contrails, which experimental evidence suggests may alter weather patterns.

Uses for aircraft 
Aircraft are produced in several different types optimized for various uses; military aircraft, which includes not just combat types but many types of supporting aircraft, and civil aircraft, which include all non-military types, experimental and model.

Military 

A military aircraft is any aircraft that is operated by a legal or insurrectionary armed service of any type. Military aircraft can be either combat or non-combat:

 Combat aircraft are aircraft designed to destroy enemy equipment using its own armament. Combat aircraft divide broadly into fighters and bombers, with several in-between types, such as fighter-bombers and attack aircraft, including attack helicopters.
 Non-combat aircraft are not designed for combat as their primary function, but may carry weapons for self-defense. Non-combat roles include search and rescue, reconnaissance, observation, transport, training, and aerial refueling. These aircraft are often variants of civil aircraft.

Most military aircraft are powered heavier-than-air types. Other types, such as gliders and balloons, have also been used as military aircraft; for example, balloons were used for observation during the American Civil War and World War I, and military gliders were used during World War II to land troops.

Civil 

Civil aircraft divide into commercial and general types, however there are some overlaps.

Commercial aircraft include types designed for scheduled and charter airline flights, carrying passengers, mail and other cargo. The larger passenger-carrying types are the airliners, the largest of which are wide-body aircraft. Some of the smaller types are also used in general aviation, and some of the larger types are used as VIP aircraft.

General aviation is a catch-all covering other kinds of private (where the pilot is not paid for time or expenses) and commercial use, and involving a wide range of aircraft types such as business jets (bizjets), trainers, homebuilt, gliders, warbirds and hot air balloons to name a few. The vast majority of aircraft today are general aviation types.

Experimental 

An experimental aircraft is one that has not been fully proven in flight, or that carries a Special Airworthiness Certificate, called an Experimental Certificate in United States parlance. This often implies that the aircraft is testing new aerospace technologies, though the term also refers to amateur-built and kit-built aircraft, many of which are based on proven designs.

Model 

A model aircraft is a small unmanned type made to fly for fun, for static display, for aerodynamic research or for other purposes. A scale model is a replica of some larger design.

See also

Lists 
 Early flying machines
 Flight altitude record
 List of aircraft
 List of civil aircraft
 List of fighter aircraft
 List of individual aircraft
 List of large aircraft
 List of aviation, aerospace and aeronautical terms

Topics 
 Aircraft hijacking
 Aircraft spotting
 Air traffic control
 Airport
 Flying car
 Personal air vehicle
 Powered parachute
 Spacecraft
 Spaceplane

References

External links

History
 The Evolution of Modern Aircraft (NASA)
 Virtual Museum
 Smithsonian Air and Space Museum - online collection with a particular focus on history of aircraft and spacecraft
 Amazing Early Flying Machines  slideshow by Life magazine

Information
 Airliners.net
 Aviation Dictionary - free aviation terms, phrases and jargons
 New Scientists aviation page